Southern Oregon Speedway is a 3/8-mile banked dirt race track located near White City, Oregon, United States.

The speedway is part of the Jackson County Sports Park, which also contains a shooting range, a dragstrip, and a go-kart track.

The track operates on a weekly basis from April through October each year, weather permitting.  It features several classes of race cars: Mini Stock, Super 4, Pro Stock, Dwarf, and Modified. Other classes, like 360 Sprint and Late Model, are featured on an irregular basis.

References

External links
Southern Oregon Speedway (official website)
Jackson County Sports Park (official website)

Dirt oval race tracks in the United States
Tourist attractions in Jackson County, Oregon
Motorsport venues in Oregon
Buildings and structures in Jackson County, Oregon
1996 establishments in Oregon
Sports venues completed in 1996